April in Paris is a 1952 American musical romantic comedy film directed by David Butler and starring Doris Day, Ray Bolger and Claude Dauphin.

Plot
Winthrop Putnam is the Assistant Secretary to the Assistant to the Undersecretary of State, and was formerly Assistant Assistant Secretary to the Assistant to the Undersecretary of State. Winthrop tells a Frenchman, Philippe Farquotte that owes back taxes, but Philippe is not allowed any help from his friends to get back home to Paris. Philippe ends up becoming an employee aboard a ship. Winthrop jumps onboard to give Ethel Jackson mistaken for Ethel Barrymore unhappy information that is was inadvertently told that she was to represent the American theatre at an art exposition in Paris. Instead, the invitation is received and accepted by Ethel "Dynamite" Jackson, an All-American Broadway chorus girl. Ethel and Winthrop meet on the way to Paris and fall in love. However, Winthrop is engages to Marcia Sherman, daughter of his boss Secretary Robert Sherman. After a misunderstanding, Winthrop and Ethel ultimately end up together.

Cast
 Doris Day as Ethel S. "Dynamite" Jackson
 Ray Bolger as S. Winthrop Putnam
 Claude Dauphin as Philippe Fouquet
 Eve Miller as Marcia Sherman
 George Givot as François
 Paul Harvey as Secretary Robert Sherman
 Herbert Farjeon as Joshua Stevens
 Wilson Millar as Sinclair Wilson
 Raymond Largay as Joseph Welmar
 John Alvin as Tracy
 Jack Lomas as cab driver
 Jarma Lewis as Chorine

Songs
 "April in Paris" – Yip Harburg
 This song was first a hit in 1932, composed by Vernon Duke and written by Harburg.
 "It Must Be Good" – Doris Day
 "I'm Gonna Ring the Bell Tonight" – Doris Day and Ray Bolger
 "That's What Makes Paris Paree" – Doris Day and Claude Dauphin
 "I'm Going to Rock the Boat" – Doris Day
 "Give Me Your Lips" – Claude Dauphin
 "I Ask You" – Doris Day, Ray Bolger, and Claude Dauphin
 "The Place You Hold in My Heart (I Know a Place)" – Doris Day
 "Auprès de ma blonde" – Claude Dauphin

References

External links
 
 
 
 
 

1952 films
1952 musical comedy films
1952 romantic comedy films
1950s English-language films
1950s romantic musical films
American musical comedy films
American romantic comedy films
American romantic musical films
Films directed by David Butler
Films set in Paris
Warner Bros. films
1950s American films